Robert Farquharson (21 June 1836 – 8 June 1918) was a Scottish doctor and Liberal politician, who served as the Member of Parliament (MP) for Aberdeenshire West for 25 years.

Early life and education
Farquharson was born in Edinburgh, the second eldest of six sons, to Francis Farquharson of Finzean (1802-1876), a well-known ophthalmic surgeon, and his wife Alison Mary (née Ainslie) (1802-1863). Alison was the daughter of Robert Ainslie, a close friend of the poet Robert Burns. 

Farquharson was educated at Edinburgh Academy, before receiving his medical education at the University of Edinburgh, where he graduated with an MD in 1858, presenting the thesis "On the parasite diseases of the scalp".

Military & medical career 
In 1859 Farquharson became an assistant surgeon in the Royal Artillery, but was attached to the Coldstream Guards later that year. Upon his retirement in 1868, he became the medical officer for Rugby School in Warwickshire, as well as serving as hon. assistant surgeon for the 3rd Warwickshire Rifle Volunteer Corps. After spending time visiting medical schools across Europe, he moved to London in 1874, working as a physician at St Mary's Hospital and the Belgrave Hospital for Children in London. He also served as a lecturer for St Mary's Hospital School. Farquharson became a Fellow of the Royal College of Physicians in London in 1877. He was also a Justice of the peace and was appointed a Deputy Lieutenant for Aberdeenshire in the same year.

Political career 

Following the death of his father in 1876, Farquharson became the proprietor of the family estate and home, Finzean House. Upon his return to Aberdeenshire, he was twice considered as a candidate for by-elections in the constituencies of West Aberdeenshire and Glasgow and Aberdeen Universities. He eventually decided to stand for West Aberdeenshire at the 1880 general election and was subsequently elected. 

Given his medical background, Farquharson became well known in the House of Commons for his work in medical and science affairs, and often served on committees involved in a range of issues, including the Contagious Diseases Act. He was strongly opposed to granting the right to vote to women. Additionally, he was chairman of the Private Bills Committee and the Scottish Liberal Party during his final session. From 1898 to 1899, he served as chairman of the Parliamentary Bills Committee of the B.M.A. In 1884, he was a guest at Haddo House for a dinner hosted by John Hamilton-Gordon, 1st Marquess of Aberdeen and Temair in honour of William Ewart Gladstone on his tour of Scotland. Farquharson was re-elected five times, although his majority in 1886 was down to 80. In 1905 he announced he would stand down at the following election, and he was succeeded by John Henderson in 1906.

Personal life 
Farquharson and his younger brother Joseph Farquharson looked after the estate at Finzean, Aberdeenshire. His brother was an artist and through this connection, he had his portrait painted by the American artist John Singer Sargent. Farquharson was the author of numerous books including his autobiographical My First Election, from In and Out of Parliament (1911) and The House of Commons from Within (1912). 

A lifelong bachelor, Farquharson died in June 1918, following a long illness of almost two years. He was buried in the family plot in Birse, alongside his parents.

References

External links

1837 births
1918 deaths
Scottish Liberal Party MPs
Members of the Parliament of the United Kingdom for Scottish constituencies
UK MPs 1880–1885
UK MPs 1885–1886
UK MPs 1886–1892
UK MPs 1892–1895
UK MPs 1895–1900
UK MPs 1900–1906
People from Aberdeenshire
Deputy Lieutenants of Aberdeenshire
Alumni of the University of Edinburgh
Fellows of the Royal College of Physicians
Members of the Privy Council of the United Kingdom